Tau Sculptoris (τ Scl, τ Sculptoris) is a binary star system in the southern constellation of Sculptor, about 8° to the east-southeast of Alpha Sculptoris. It is faintly visible to the naked eye with a combined apparent visual magnitude of +5.69. Based upon an annual parallax shift of 14.42 mas as seen from Earth, it is located around 230 light years from the Sun.

The binary nature of this system was discovered by English astronomer John Herschel in 1835. The current orbital elements are based upon a fraction of a single orbit, as the estimated orbital period is around 1,503 years. The system has a semimajor axis of 3.2 arc seconds and an eccentricity of 0.6. The primary member, component A, is a yellow-white hued F-type main sequence star with an apparent magnitude of +6.06 and a stellar classification of F2 V. The companion, component B, is a magnitude 7.35 star.

References

F-type main-sequence stars
Binary stars
Sculptor (constellation)
Sculptoris, Tau
009906
007463
0462
Durchmusterung objects